Public Security Force is a term which may refer to:

 Jordanian National Police
 Polícia de Segurança Pública the Portuguese National Police
 Public Security Forces the Bahraini principal law enforcement arm of the Ministry of Interior

See also
 Public Security Police